Fairtex Gym is the name given to a number of Muay Thai, Kick boxing, Boxing, Brazilian jiujitsu and Mixed martial arts gyms around the world. The original Fairtex Gym was founded in Bangkok, Thailand in 1975.

History

The Fairtex Garments Factory Company Limited was founded by Mr. Philip Wong in 1971, selling Muay Thai training equipment and Fairtex branded T-shirts to the Thai department store market. The first Fairtex Gym was created in Bangkok. The Camp was initially established in central Bangkok but later relocated to Bangplee, about 25 km away. This location was chosen specifically to create a professional training atmosphere away from the distractions of Bangkok. The venue benefits from clean, fresh air and the cooling ocean breeze from the gulf of Thailand - a refreshing contrast to the noise and pollution of Bangkok.

Wong created Fairtex Promotions in 1978 when he became a promoter at the Lumpinee Stadium. In 1998, Mr. Philip Wong, Founder & Chairman, partnered with Anthony Lin, President & CEO, to open Fairtex Equipment Company Limited to manufacture, market and distribute Fairtex branded equipment and apparels worldwide.  
In 1993, a Fairtex Gym was opened in Chandler, Arizona, United States but was relocated to San Francisco, California in 1996.  In 2004, Anthony Lin moved Fairtex to a new location in San Francisco. In 2007, Fairtex Mountain View was opened and Fairtex Newark, CA in 2009. In 2013, Fairtex Mountain View closed, leaving no Fairtex gyms in the United States. Nine gyms were opened in the Tokyo metropolitan area in 2004, another in Pattaya the following year in 2005 and one in 2012, Fairtex in China.

Author Sam Sheridan wrote about his time training at Fairtex in his book A Fighter's Heart. Some of his experience can also be seen in the 2002 documentary Thai Boxing: A Fighting Chance.

There are now Fairtex gyms Bangplee, Pattaya (Thailand) Arakawa, Chiba, Taito and Warabi (Japan).

Partnership 

 Pattaya Boxing World

Notable fighters

 Jongsanan Fairtex
 Saemapetch Fairtex
 Ferrari Fairtex
 Stamp Fairtex
 Bunkerd Fairtex
 Neungsiam Fairtex
 Yodsanklai Fairtex
 Naruepol Fairtex
 Kaew Fairtex
 Alex Gong
 Gilbert Melendez
 Ricardo Miranda
 Scott Smith
 James Irvin
 Jean-Claude Leuyer
 Scott Lighty
 Jake Shields
 Daniel Roberts
 Yvonne Trevino
 Ryan Roy
 Alex Serdyukov
 Mark Abelardo
 Omar El Halabi
 Uloomi Karim
 Anita Karim
 Smilla Sundell

References

External

Instagram

1975 establishments in Thailand
Kickboxing training facilities
Kickboxing in Japan
Kickboxing in Thailand
Kickboxing in the United States
Sportswear brands
Muay Thai